"Umlando" is a song by Toss, 9umba, and Mdoovar featuring Sino Msolo, Lady Du, Young Stunna, Sir Trill, and Slade released on January 13, 2022. It was produced by Letlotlo-la-bakuena Letlatsa, and Mduduzi Memela.

It debuted at number 3 in South Africa. The song was certified platinum in South Africa.

Commercial performance 
The song debuted number 3 on Apple Music charts Top 100 and surpassed 7.5 million streams on digital streaming platforms.

"Umlando" was certified platinum in South Africa.

Accolades 

!
|-
|2022
| "Umlando"
|TikTok Viral Song of the Year
| 
|

Charts

Release history

References 

2020 songs